Euptychia is a genus of satyrid butterflies found in the Neotropical realm. The genus was erected by Jacob Hübner in 1818.

Species
Listed alphabetically:
Euptychia attenboroughi Neild, Nakahara, Fratello & Le Crom, 2015
Euptychia cesarense Pulido, Andrade, Peña & Lamas, 2011
Euptychia enyo Butler, 1867
Euptychia ernestina Weymer, 1911
Euptychia fetna Butler, 1870
Euptychia hannemanni Forster, 1964
Euptychia hilara (C. Felder & R. Felder, 1867)
Euptychia insolata Butler & H. Druce, 1872
Euptychia jesia Butler, 1869
Euptychia marceli Brévignon, 2005
Euptychia meta Weymer, 1911
Euptychia mollina (Hübner, 1813)
Euptychia neildi Brévignon, 2005
Euptychia picea Butler, 1867
Euptychia rubrofasciata L. Miller & J. Miller, 1988
Euptychia rufocincta Weymer, 1911
Euptychia sophiae Zacca, Nakahara, Dolibaina & Dias, 2015
Euptychia westwoodi Butler, 1867

References

Euptychiina
Nymphalidae of South America
Butterfly genera
Taxa named by Jacob Hübner